Héctor Cincunegui (born 28 July 1940) is a Uruguayan former footballer. He played in eight matches for the Uruguay national football team from 1964 to 1967. He was also part of Uruguay's squad for the 1967 South American Championship.

References

External links
 

1940 births
Living people
Uruguayan footballers
Uruguay international footballers
Place of birth missing (living people)
Association football defenders
Danubio F.C. players
Club Nacional de Football players
Clube Atlético Mineiro players
Clube Náutico Capibaribe players
Uruguay Montevideo players
Uruguayan expatriate footballers
Expatriate footballers in Brazil